In mathematics, more precisely in measure theory, Lebesgue's decomposition theorem states that for every two σ-finite signed measures  and  on a measurable space   there exist two σ-finite signed measures  and  such that:

 
  (that is,  is absolutely continuous with respect to )

Refinement
Lebesgue's decomposition theorem can be refined in a number of ways.

First, the decomposition of the singular part of a regular Borel measure on the real line can be refined:

where
 νcont is the absolutely continuous part
 νsing is the singular continuous part
 νpp is the pure point part (a discrete measure).

Second, absolutely continuous measures are classified by the Radon–Nikodym theorem, and discrete measures are easily understood. Hence (singular continuous measures aside), Lebesgue decomposition gives a very explicit description of measures.  The Cantor measure (the probability measure on the real line whose cumulative distribution function is the Cantor function) is an example of a singular continuous measure.

Related concepts

Lévy–Itō decomposition

The analogous decomposition for a stochastic processes is the Lévy–Itō decomposition: given a Lévy process X, it can be decomposed as a sum of three independent Lévy processes  where:
  is a Brownian motion with drift, corresponding to the absolutely continuous part;
  is a compound Poisson process, corresponding to the pure point part;
  is a square integrable pure jump martingale that almost surely has a countable number of jumps on a finite interval, corresponding to the singular continuous part.

See also
 Decomposition of spectrum
 Hahn decomposition theorem and the corresponding Jordan decomposition theorem

Citations

References
 
 
 

Integral calculus
Theorems in measure theory